The Eight Belles Stakes is a Grade II American Thoroughbred horse race for three-year-old filly sprinters run at a distance of 7 furlongs at Churchill Downs in Louisville, Kentucky each year on Kentucky Oaks Day.

History

The inaugural running of the event was on the opening day of the 1956 Spring meeting at Churchill Downs on Saturday, 27 April 1956 as the seventh and main feature race on the nine race program named the Oaks Prep over a distance of six furlongs. The event attracted the 1955 US Champion Two-Year-Old Filly Doubledogdare and Calumet Farm's fine filly Princess Turia. The event was scheduled as a preparatory event for the much longer Kentucky Oaks which was scheduled on the following Friday. Doubledogdare started as the 2/5 odds-on favorite and held off Princess Turia to win by half a length in a time of 1:11. However, six days later Princess Turia turned the tables and defeated her rival in the Kentucky Oaks by a neck.

In 1961 the distance of the event was increased to seven furlongs. 

The 1962 winner Cicada started 3/10 odds-on and easily won the event by four lengths under the reins of US Hall of Fame jockey William L. Shoemaker. Cicada then proceeded to win the Kentucky Oaks enroute to being crowned US Champion Three-Year-Old Filly.

In 1967 the event was renamed to the La Troienne Stakes for one of the greatest broodmares in the United States throughout the twentieth century, La Troienne. The 1967 winner Fure Sail would go on to being crowned US Champion Three-Year-Old Filly as would the 1968 winner Dark Mirage and 1972 winner Susan's Girl. The 1972 Canadian Horse of the Year La Prevoyante would win the event in 1973.

In 1982 the event was run in split divisions. This was only time that the event was run in split divisions.

The event was classified as Grade III in 1998. 

Between 2004 and 2010 the event was run over a lightly longer distance of seven and one-half furlongs.

Churchill Downs announced that beginning in 2009 this race would be called the Eight Belles Stakes in honor of the deceased filly, Eight Belles, who finished second in the 2008 Kentucky Derby. In 2010, the Louisville Distaff Stakes was renamed the La Troienne Stakes.

Since 2011 the event has been scheduled on the same card as the Kentucky Oaks. 

The American Graded Stakes Committee upgraded the race to its current Grade II status in 2016.

Records
Speed record:
7 furlongs:  1:21.29 - Contested  (2012)
 furlongs:  1:28.18  - Joint Effort  (2006)

Margins
 lengths - Roxelana (2000) 

Most wins by a jockey:
 9 - Pat Day (1981, 1982, 1986, 1988, 1989, 1990, 1996, 1999, 2001) 

Most wins by a trainer:
 3 - Stanley H. Rieser (1964, 1966, 1969)
 3 - Woodford C. Stephens  (1970, 1978, 1981)  
 3 - Steve Asmussen (2002, 2009, 2018)
 3 - William I. Mott (1993, 2016, 2021)
 3 - Brad H. Cox (2017, 2019, 2022)

Most wins by an owner:
 3 - Heiligbrodt Racing Stable (2002, 2009, 2018)

Winners

Notes:

§ Ran as an entry

† In the 1974 running Clemenna was first past the post but came out in the straight causing interference to the second place finisher Shantung Silk and was disqualified and placed second. Shantung Silk was declared the winner.

See also
 List of American and Canadian Graded races

External site
 Churchill Downs Media Guide - $250,000 Eight Belles

References

1956 establishments in Kentucky
Churchill Downs horse races
Flat horse races for three-year-old fillies
Graded stakes races in the United States
Recurring sporting events established in 1956
Grade 2 stakes races in the United States
Horse races in Kentucky